The 2014 Aberto de Tênis do Rio Grande do Sul was a professional tennis tournament played on clay courts. It was the third edition of the tournament which was part of the 2014 ATP Challenger Tour. It took place in Porto Alegre, Brazil between 22 and 28 September 2014.

Singles main-draw entrants

Seeds

 1 Rankings are as of September 15, 2014.

Other entrants
The following players received wildcards into the singles main draw:
  Rafael Matos
  Fabrício Neis
  Eduardo Russi Assumpção
  Marcelo Zormann

The following players received entry from the qualifying draw:
  Daniel Dutra da Silva
  Tiago Lopes
  João Menezes
  Caio Zampieri

Champions

Singles

 Carlos Berlocq def.  Diego Schwartzman, 6–4, 4–6, 6–0

Doubles

 Guido Andreozzi /  Guillermo Durán def.  Facundo Bagnis /  Diego Schwartzman, 6–3, 6–3

External links
Official Website

Aberto de Tenis do Rio Grande do Sul
Aberto de Tênis do Rio Grande do Sul
2014 in Brazilian tennis